Malcolm Barrie Windeatt (born 5 April 1952) is a former British international swimmer who represented Great Britain at the 1972 Summer Olympics.

Swimming career
Born in Torquay, he moved to Manchester in his late teens due to a lack of suitable training facilities in his home town, choosing to study at the University of Manchester.

He represented England at the 1970 British Commonwealth Games in Edinburgh, Scotland, winning a bronze medal in the 4×100 m freestyle relay, and finishing eighth in the individual 100 m freestyle.

He represented Great Britain at the 1972 Olympic Games in Munich, swimming the individual 100 m freestyle, where he did not progress beyond the heats, and forming part of the 4×100 m medley relay team who finished seventh.

He is a four times winner of the British Championship in 100 metres freestyle (1969, 1970, 1971, 1972).

See also
 List of Commonwealth Games medallists in swimming (men)

References
sports-reference.com

1952 births
Living people
Sportspeople from Torquay
English male swimmers
Alumni of the University of Manchester
Olympic swimmers of Great Britain
Swimmers at the 1972 Summer Olympics
Swimmers at the 1970 British Commonwealth Games
Commonwealth Games bronze medallists for England
Commonwealth Games medallists in swimming
Medallists at the 1970 British Commonwealth Games